Several vessels have been named Gibraltar, for Gibraltar:

  was  launched in France in 1776, almost certainly under another name. Between 1787 and 1795, she was a whaler in the northern whale (Greenland) fishery. A French privateer captured her in February 1796 as she was on her way to the fishery, and burnt her. Her loss led the British government to increase the protection of the outward-bound whaling fleet.
A Swede purchased her. On 19 November 1881 she was wrecked at Lonstrup, south of Hirtshals, Denmark, on a voyage from Sunderland to Stockholm with a cargo of coal.
 , converted from the 1859-built merchant steamer Habana, was the first steam cruiser of the Confederate States Navy during the American Civil War. She operated as a commerce raider in the Caribbean and in the Atlantic Ocean against Union merchant shipping between July and December 1861, taking eighteen prizes until   Union Navy warships trapped her in Gibraltar. She was sold in 1862 to the British office of a Confederate merchant and renamed Gibraltar, successfully running the Union blockade in 1863 and surviving the war.
Gibraltar was sailing from Karachi to Marseilles.

See also
  – one of seven vessels of the British Royal Navy

Citations

Ship names